Puka Llacta (Quechua puka red, llaqta place (village, town, city, country, nation)) is the name of a Peruvian Maoist political group that had its origins in the 1970s.

A leftist leader, Jorge Hurtado "Ludovico", was a member of the central committee of the Communist Party of Peru - Red Fatherland (Partido Comunista del Perú (Patria Roja)), which was part of the Revolutionary Left Union (UNIR), founded in 1969.  They claimed to be Maoists, even when they were somewhat reformists and they had close ties to the Communist Party of China. In 1978, Patria Roja broke into 2 factions, one of which is the "Puka Llacta" Communist Party of Peru, with the intention of making concrete actions regarding their discourse of the people's war.

It is unknown if their militants actually participated in violent acts. However, it is said that in late 1984 Puka Llacta supported the advance of Shining Path toward the Huallaga Province, after a military offensive in the Ayacucho and Huancavelica departments.

In 2001, David Jimenez Sardon, who used to be affiliated with Puka Llacta, was elected regional president of Puno under the political party called Autonomous Regional Quechua Aymara. Jimenez, an agronomist from the UNA and manager of the EEAA in Junin and Ancash, had a campaign team composed of relatives and old Puka Llacta comrades.

References

Communist parties in Peru
Internal conflict in Peru
Paramilitary organisations based in Peru
Maoist organizations
Rebel groups in Peru